Plymouth Coliseum, formerly known as St Boniface Arena, is a rugby field and speedway venue in Plymouth, Devon. It is situated adjacent to the River Plym near Marsh Mills.

Stadium
The stadium dates back to 1982 and has hosted speedway since 2006.  The stadium has recently been upgraded by the owner, speedway promoter Mike Bowden.

Speedway
The stadium is the home of the Plymouth Gladiators who currently compete in the Championship.

Speedway track maintenance vehicles owned by the Gladiators were vandalized in an arson attack on 13 July 2022, following a series of attacks in which club vehicles were damaged. Police opened a criminal investigation, but club owner Mark Phillips expressed disappointment at the lack of consequences for vandals and trespassers at the Coliseum.

School Playing Fields
St Boniface's Catholic College use half of their ground as a school playing field.  The field is also used by Plympton Victoria Rugby Club.

See also
 St Boniface's Catholic College
 Plymouth Devils

References 

Motorsport venues in England
Sports venues in Plymouth, Devon
Speedway venues in England